Nikolay Savin (born 1 June 1976) is a Belarusian wrestler. He competed in the men's freestyle 63 kg at the 2000 Summer Olympics.

References

 

1976 births
Living people
Belarusian male sport wrestlers
Olympic wrestlers of Belarus
Wrestlers at the 2000 Summer Olympics
Place of birth missing (living people)